The Ministry of Foreign Affairs and Foreign Trade is the ministry responsible for handling Jamaica's external relations and foreign trade. The ministry's current director is Senator Kamina Johnson-Smith.

The ministry's official mission statement notes that it "is responsible for the implementation of Jamaica’s foreign policy, the management of Jamaica international relations and the promotion of its interests overseas."

History
After achieving independence from the United Kingdom in August 1962, Jamaica immediately established its foreign ministry, then known as the Ministry of External Affairs. In 1976, the government changed the ministry's name to the Ministry of Foreign Affairs and eventually added "and Foreign Trade" sometime later to reflect the full scope of its mission.

List of ministers
This is a list of Ministers of Foreign Affairs and Foreign Trade of Jamaica:

1962–1967: Sir Alexander Bustamante
1967–1972: Hugh Shearer
1972–1975: Michael Manley
1975–1977: Dudley Thompson
1977–1980: P. J. Patterson
1980–1989: Hugh Shearer
1989–1993: David Coore
1993–1995: Paul Robertson
1995–2000: Seymour Mullings
2000–2001: Paul Robertson
2001–2006: Keith Desmond Knight
2006–2007: Anthony Hylton
2007–2012: Kenneth Baugh
2012–2016: Arnold Joseph Nicholson
2016–present: Kamina Johnson-Smith

See also
 Foreign relations of Jamaica
 Diplomatic missions of Jamaica

References

External links
 [https://mfaft.gov.jm/

Ministries and agencies of the government of Jamaica
Jamaica, Foreign affairs
Jamaica
Foreign relations of Jamaica